The Swiss Mixed Doubles Curling Championship is the national championship of mixed doubles curling (one man and one woman) in Switzerland. It has been held annually since the 2013–2014 season. The championships are organized by the Swiss Curling Association.

List of champions and medallists

Medal record for curlers

References

External links
Resultate Archiv Elite - swisscurling
Swiss Curling Association Champions
Erfolge des Curling Club Dübendorf

See also
Swiss Men's Curling Championship
Swiss Women's Curling Championship
Swiss Mixed Curling Championship
Swiss Junior Curling Championships
Swiss Senior Curling Championships
Swiss Wheelchair Curling Championship

Curling competitions in Switzerland
National curling championships
Recurring sporting events established in 2014
2014 establishments in Switzerland
Annual sporting events in Switzerland
Mixed doubles curling